Yanyurt is a village in the Aksaray District, Aksaray Province, Turkey. Its population is 320 (2021). The village is populated by Zazas.

References 

Villages in Aksaray District
Kurdish settlements in Aksaray Province